Somovit Point (‘Nos Somovit’ \'nos 'so-mo-vit\) is a point on the east coast of Robert Island in the South Shetland Islands, Antarctica projecting 500 m into Bransfield Strait between Kruni Cove and Tsepina Cove.

It is situated 900 m north-northwest of Batuliya Point and 1.1 km south-southwest of Kitchen Point.

The point is named after the settlement of Somovit in northern Bulgaria.

Location
Bulgarian mapping in 2009.

Maps
 L.L. Ivanov. Antarctica: Livingston Island and Greenwich, Robert, Snow and Smith Islands. Scale 1:120000 topographic map.  Troyan: Manfred Wörner Foundation, 2009.

References
 Somovit Point. SCAR Composite Gazetteer of Antarctica.
 Bulgarian Antarctic Gazetteer. Antarctic Place-names Commission. (details in Bulgarian, basic data in English)

External links
 Somovit Point. Copernix satellite image

Headlands of Robert Island
Bulgaria and the Antarctic